This is an incomplete list of historic houses in South Australia.

Historic houses

See also
National Trust of South Australia
List of National Trust properties in Australia#South Australia
List of Nationally Significant 20th-Century Architecture in South Australia
List of historic homesteads in Australia#South Australia

References

Further reading
Burden, Michael. (1993) Lost Adelaide: a photographic record. Melbourne: Oxford University Press.
Stone, Robert M. (2010) Stately Homes: Mirror and Metaphor of Colonial South Australia, PhD thesis, Department of Archaeology, Flinders University of S.A.
 Table of contents (1MB, 16 pages); Vol.1 (20MB, 490 pages); Vol.2 – Appendices (2MB, 328 pages); Vol.3 – House Profiles (86MB, 542 pages)
Extracts: http://federation-house.wikispaces.com/Adelaide+Federation+Heritage

External links
Historic and Stately Homes
National Trust SA - Places
SA Heritage Places Database Search

Lists of buildings and structures in South Australia
Houses in South Australia
History of Adelaide
Historic houses